William M. Jackson (born January 24, 1953) is a former associate judge on the Superior Court of the District of Columbia.

Education and career 
Jackson earned his Bachelor of Arts from Brown University and his Juris Doctor from Harvard Law School.

After graduating, Jackson joined the Justice Department as a staff attorney in the Anti-trust Division.

D.C. Superior Court 
President George H. W. Bush nominated Jackson on January 22, 1992, to a 15-year term as an associate judge on the Superior Court of the District of Columbia. On May 14, 1992, the Senate Committee on Homeland Security and Governmental Affairs held a hearing on his nomination. On June 25, 1992, the Committee reported his nomination favorably to the senate floor. On June 26, 1992, the full Senate confirmed his nomination by voice vote. He retired on March 31, 2022.

References

1953 births
Living people
20th-century American judges
21st-century American judges
African-American judges
Brown University alumni
Harvard Law School alumni
Judges of the Superior Court of the District of Columbia
Lawyers from Baltimore
United States Department of Justice lawyers
20th-century African-American people
21st-century African-American people